Batt is an English surname, derived from Bartholomew. Notable people with the surname include:

 Batt (Gentlemen cricketer), English cricketer (no first name known)
Bryan Batt (born 1963), American actor
Charles Batt (1928–2007), Australian politician
Damian Batt (born 1984), English footballer
David Alan Batt (born 1958), the birth name of English musician David Sylvian
Dennis E. Batt (1886–19??), American political activist and journalist
Isaac Batt (ca. 1725–1791), Canadian fur trader
Jacque Batt (died 2014), First Lady of Idaho 1995-1999
Jay Batt, American politician
Mike Batt (born 1949), English songwriter
Neil Batt (born 1937), Australian politician
Phil Batt (1927–2023), American politician
Ryley Batt (born 1989), Australian wheelchair rugby player
Stephen Batt (born 1959), the birth name of English musician Steve Jansen
Terry Batt (born 1949) Australian sculptor

English-language surnames
Patronymic surnames